Anagnostopoulos is a Greek surname meaning "son of Anagnostis". The  genitive case is Anagnostopoulou (Αναγνωστοπούλου) meaning daughter or son of Anagnostopoulos. It may refer to these people:
 Spiro Agnew (Spiro Anagnostopoulos), American politician and the 39th vice president of the United States
 Panagiotis Anagnostopoulos  (c. 1790–1854), Greek revolutionary leader
 Panagiotis Anagnostopoulos (general) (1914–?), Greek general and politician
 Sia Anagnostopoulou (born 1959), Greek politician
 Dimitris Anagnostopoulos (born 1970), Greek chess Grandmaster
 Chrysoula Anagnostopoulou (born 1991), Greek discus thrower
 Ioanna Anagnostopoulou (born 1997), Greek gymnast

Greek-language surnames
Surnames